Junoob Baghdad Sport Club, is an Iraqi football team based in Al-Latifiya, Baghdad, that plays in the Iraq Division Three.

Managerial history
 Basil Fadhel

See also
 2019–20 Iraq FA Cup
 2020–21 Iraq FA Cup
 2021–22 Iraq FA Cup

References

External links
 Junoob Baghdad SC on Goalzz.com
 Iraq Clubs- Foundation Dates

Football clubs in Iraq
2019 establishments in Iraq
Association football clubs established in 2019
Football clubs in Baghdad